Ammonium dihydrogen phosphate (ADP), also known as monoammonium phosphate (MAP) is a chemical compound with the chemical formula (NH4)(H2PO4). ADP is a major ingredient of agricultural fertilizers      and some fire extinguishers.  It also has significant uses in optics and electronics.

Chemical properties
Monoammonium phosphate is soluble in water and crystallizes from it as the anhydrous salt in the tetragonal system, as elongated prisms or needles.   It is practically insoluble in ethanol.

Solid monoammonium phosphate can be considered stable in practice for temperatures up to 200 °C, when it decomposes into gaseous ammonia  and molten phosphoric acid . At 125 °C the partial pressure of ammonia is 0.05 mm Hg.

A solution of stoichometric monoammonium phosphate is acidic (pH 4.7 at 0.1% concentration, 4.2 at 5%).

Preparation
Monoammonium phosphate is industrially prepared by the exothermic reaction of phosphoric acid and ammonia in the correct proportions:

  +  →  

Crystalline MAP then precipitates.

Uses

Agriculture
The largest use of monoammonium phosphate by weight is in agriculture, as an ingredient of fertilizers. It supplies soil with the elements nitrogen and phosphorus in a form usable by plants. Its NPK label is 12-61-0 (12-27-0), meaning that it contains 12% by weight of elemental nitrogen and (nominally) 61% of phosphorus pentoxide , or 27% of elemental phosphorus.

Fire extinguishers
The compound is also a component of the ABC powder in some dry chemical fire extinguishers.

Optics
Monoammonium phosphate is a widely used crystal in the field of optics due to its birefringence properties.

Electronics
Monoammonium phosphate crystals are piezoelectric, a property required in some active sonar transducers (the alternative being transducers that use magnetostriction). In the 1950s ADP crystals largely replaced the quartz and Rochelle salt crystals in transducers because they are easier to work than quartz and, unlike Rochelle salt, are not deliquescent.

Toys
Being relatively non-toxic, MAP is also a popular substance for recreational crystal growing, being sold as toy kits mixed with dyes of various colors.

Natural occurrence
The compound appears in nature as the rare mineral biphosphammite. It is formed in guano deposits. A related compound, that is the monohydrogen counterpart, is the even more scarce phosphammite.

References

Phosphates
Ammonium compounds
Fire suppression agents
Inorganic fertilizers